A&A may refer to:


Computing, science and technology
 Astronomy and Astrophysics, a scientific journal
 Anesthesia & Analgesia, a medical journal

Entertainment
 Several related games within the "Axis & Allies" franchise which all deal with World War II combat:
 Axis & Allies, a series of strategy board games
 Axis & Allies (2004 video game)
 Axis & Allies Miniatures, a miniature wargaming system
 Angels & Airwaves, an alternative rock band
 Austin & Ally, a Disney Channel sitcom

Other uses
 A&A Records, a defunct Canadian record store chain

See also